Hose House No. 2, at 600 Colorado Blvd. in Idaho Springs, Colorado, was built around 1882.  It was listed on the National Register of Historic Places in 1998.

It is a one-story  building.  "It was built to house a fire hose cart associated with early volunteer fire fighting efforts in the west end of Idaho Springs."  It served in that way until 1929.

It has also been known as the West End Hose House and as the 6th and Colorado Hose House.

See also  
 Bryan Hose House
 National Register of Historic Places listings in Clear Creek County, Colorado

References

Fire stations on the National Register of Historic Places in Colorado
National Register of Historic Places in Clear Creek County, Colorado
Victorian architecture in Colorado
Fire stations completed in 1882
1882 establishments in Colorado